"It's Late" is a song written by Dorsey Burnette, who recorded it on August 28, 1958. However, it was not released and its first appearance was on a compilation album by Imperial Records in 1980. It is better known for its release as a single by Ricky Nelson in February 1959, subsequently reaching number 3 in the UK, number 9 on the Billboard Hot 100, and number 30 on the R&B chart in that year. The song is featured on the 1959 album Ricky Sings Again.

"It's Late" is ranked number 74 on Billboard magazine's Top 100 songs of 1959.

Charts

Weekly charts

Year-end charts

Shakin' Stevens version

In 1983 Shakin' Stevens recorded the song and released it as a single on the Epic Records label as the first single from his album The Bop Won't Stop. Some of the singles were issued as a novelty-shaped picture disk. It peaked at number 11 on the UK Singles Chart.

Charts

References

1959 songs
1959 singles
Songs written by Dorsey Burnette
Ricky Nelson songs
Shakin' Stevens songs
Imperial Records singles